Basking in reflected glory (BIRGing) is a self-serving cognition whereby an individual associates themselves with known successful others such that the winner's success becomes the individual's own accomplishment.

The affiliation of another's success is enough to stimulate self glory.  The individual does not need to be personally involved in the successful action. To BIRG, they must simply associate themselves with the success. Examples of BIRGing include anything from sharing a home state with a past or present famous person, to religious affiliations, to sports teams.  For example, when a fan of a football team wears the team's jersey and boasts after a win, this fan is engaging in BIRGing.  A parent with a bumper sticker reading "My child is an honor student" is basking in the reflected glory of their child.  While many people have anecdotal accounts of BIRGing, social psychologists seek to find experimental investigations delving into BIRGing. Within social psychology, BIRGing is thought to enhance self-esteem and to be a component of self-management.

BIRGing has connections to social identity theory, which explains how self-esteem and self-evaluation can be enhanced by the identification with another person's success through basking in reflected glory not earned. Social identity is the individual's self-concept derived from perceived membership of social groups. High self-esteem is typically a perception of oneself as attractive, competent, likeable and a morally good person. The perception of having these attributes makes the person feel as if they are more attractive to the outside social world and thus more desirable to others.

BIRGing is a widespread and important impression management technique to counter any threats to self-esteem and maintain positive relations with others.  Some positive effects of BIRGing include increasing individual self-esteem and a sense of accomplishment. It can show pride of self, and pride for the other person's success, which in turn boosts one's own self-esteem.  BIRGing can be negative when done too extensively that the individual engaging in BIRGing becomes delusional or forgets the reality that they did not actually accomplish the successful event.

The opposite of BIRGing is cutting off reflected failure (CORFing).  This is the idea that people tend to disassociate themselves from lower-status individuals because they do not want their reputations affected by associating with the people who are considered failures.

Empirical findings

One of the most influential studies of this phenomenon was done by Robert Cialdini in 1976 known as The Three (Football) Field Study. He discovered that the students sought to have the success of their football team linked to them by wearing school-identified apparel. These students associated themselves with a success, even though they in no way affected or caused the success. Through three different experiments, Cialdini was able to demonstrate the BIRGing phenomenon. 
The first experiment demonstrated BIRGing by showing that students have a greater tendency to wear apparel with the university's colors and name after the football team had won a game. In the second experiment, subjects used the pronoun "we" to associate themselves more with a positive than a negative source.  This was shown most prominently when their public reputation was at risk. When the subjects failed a task, they had a greater tendency to affiliate themselves with a winner, and less of a tendency to associate themselves with a loser. The third experiment replicated the finding that students used the pronoun "we" more when describing a victory compared to a non-victory by their school's football team. The researchers found that BIRGing is an attempt to enhance one's public image. The tendency to proclaim a connection with a positive source was strongest when one's public image was threatened.  Thus, people bask in reflected glory to boost their self-esteem by associating themselves with a positive source.

A feeling of involvement is also necessary for BIRGing to occur. It is frequently seen as a cognitive process that affects behavior. In Bernhardt et al.'s study published in 1998, researchers examined physiological processes related to Basking in Reflected Glory, specifically, changes in the production of endocrine hormones. Endocrine system Fans watched their favorite sports teams (basketball and soccer) win or lose. The men's testosterone levels increased while watching their team win, but decreased while watching their team lose. Thus, this study shows that physiological processes may be involved with BIRGing, in addition to the known changes in self-esteem and cognition.

The opposite of BIRGing is cutting off reflected failure (CORFing). This is the idea that people tend to disassociate themselves from lower-status individuals because they do not want their reputations affected by associating with the people who are considered failures. In 2002, Boen et al. demonstrate this effect in a political context.  They examined houses with at least a poster or lawn sign supporting a political candidate days before elections in Belgium. The houses that showed support for the winning candidate displayed their posters and lawn signs for a longer period after the elections than did those who supported the loser. CORFing behavior was studied in basketball fans after a defeat, where the fans refuse to take a team poster, removed their posters or paraphernalia, avoided other fans and stayed in a bad mood after a defeat. Thus, the tendency for individuals to display their association with a successful source and a tendency for individuals to conceal their association with a losing team was empirically supported.

These empirical studies show how even in controlled situations, people unconsciously seek acceptance by associating themselves with successful individuals.  Whether this is accomplished by wearing brand names or parents covering their car with stickers about how talented their child is, basking in reflected glory has been found in both the naturalistic and experimental setting.

Major theoretical approaches

Although Cialdini's studies introduced the concept of BIRGing to the public and its relevance to social psychology, an operational definition is quite difficult to form. With such a wide range of possible examples, there is no set criteria by which to clearly recognize BIRGing. Rather, by a classical definition, it is more described as a subjective feeling possessed by one individual who seeks to gain acceptance or respect by associating themselves with the successes of others. However, over recent years, advances in technology (among other domains) have challenged the classic definition of BIRGing. For example, when Apple Computers became very successful, many individuals not only purchased Apple  products, but many more sought jobs or other associations with the company. Contemporary BIRGing in today's world can be seen by individuals not only associating themselves with the success of other people or groups, as was originally thought by Cialdini among others; Rather, BIRGing is the association of oneself to any company, business, or activity which is popular or highly regarded.

Facebook, Twitter, and other social networking sites have increased BIRGing with popular brands, as it allows everyone to post their affinity for or their associations with popular companies, media, businesses, etc. Furthermore, the ability for everyone to follow their favorite athletes, actors, etc. on Facebook or Twitter allows for a closer connection to and knowledge of these celebrities, therefore leading to more BIRGing. Thus, the spread of technology has not only increased the realms under which BIRGing may fall, but also increased the ease with which individuals may partake in BIRGing.

Psychological approaches to BIRGing would include Ludwig Lewisohn's behavioral approach, Charles Darwin's evolutionary approach, and to some extent even Sigmund Freud's psychodynamic approach. The behavioral approach is relevant to BIRGing as it analyzes the behavior and success of others. If one partakes in observing this behavior, they can learn which actions and people are successful or popular and can then engage in BIRGing by associating themselves  with these actions or people. Darwin's evolutionary approach can also be used to analyze BIRGing due to the idea behind survival of the fittest. In contemporary psychology, survival of the fittest applies to achieving the greatest successes possible in order to ensure the passage of one's genes into future generations. From this biological perspective, it is favorable to be popular and respected, as more mating opportunities will present themselves. This can be seen in BIRGing as individuals associate themselves with popular, attractive, or respected actions and people in order to be perceived as having more successes. Freud's psychodynamic theory can be applied to BIRGing in terms of the super ego's relationship to the ego. The super ego refers to the ideal self-image; it constitutes a view of one's self as perfect. The ego refers to the real self, meaning our consciousness and perceptions of our current selves. Thus, if an individual seeks to gain more respect or popularity, the super ego may lead to BIRGing, as that individual will associate themselves  with popular and respected entities in order to increase that individual's notion of ego.

Role of deindividuation

Another equally important contributing influence is deindividuation, a psychological state characterized by partial or complete loss of self-awareness, diffused responsibility, and decreased concern about our own behavior resulting in the abandonment of norms, restraints and inhibitions due to the involvement in a group. The individual loses their sense of self as they participate in the group's activities and choices. Deindividuation involves a loss of self-awareness which is essentially the degree to which one's attention is focused on the self, resulting in comparisons against meaningful standards. When spectators become deindividuated, their self-awareness decreases and they cease to compare their behavior against these social norms. The group's norms become their only focus, and therefore the social norms. Consequentially, situational forces are more influential. Without the comparison process of self-awareness, behavior is more likely to be inconsistent with attitude.

Applications

BIRGing is a common aspect of everyday life.  Anecdotal evidence explains how people make connections with highly positive or successful people.  States and cities list the names of famous entertainers, political candidates, beauty contest winners, etc. who were born there.  In encounters with a successful individual or famous celebrity one may recount the story several times in order to bask in the glory because one has a sense of pride after meeting such an individual. People associate with certain companies and schools in order to have a connection to a famous individual who represents these organizations. Humans are always trying to boost their self-esteem, so they continually attempt to bask in reflected glory.

Extra real-world examples:
Bragging about a famous relative (e.g., "my great, great, great grandfather was U.S. President Abraham Lincoln's cousin")
School/Accomplishment car decal in terms of adding a "bumper sticker" (e.g., "Vanderbilt University" or "My son is an Eagle Scout")
Wearing a team jersey after they win (e.g., Wearing a Green Bay Packers jersey after the 2011 Super Bowl or wearing Seahawks paraphernalia during and after they win a game)

Controversies

Most psychologists hold this theory to be true based on substantial research and evidence. However, it is difficult to define and operationalize  basking in reflected glory (discussed in "Major Theoretical Approaches"). Because examples of BIRGing are so different and unique, there is no set criterion. The classical definition of BIRGing describes it as a subjective feeling possessed by one individual who seeks to gain acceptance or respect by associating themselves with the successes of others. However, in recent years changes in culture and industry have challenged this classic definition. With these changes people are not only associating with other people, but with companies, brands, and organizations. This ability to associate with more than just the public to gain status has created the need for a new definition of Basking in Reflected Glory.

Limitations

Limitations that apply to both CORFing and BIRGing are perceptions and expectations about performance and how they have an impact. Many scholars have found that the confirmation and disconfirmation of the expected victory or loss has a significant effect on BIRGing and CORFing. For example, if one predicts that one's favorite team is going to lose, one is less likely to be afraid to associate with that team because they predicted the loss. This supports that a person is more likely to participate in BIRGing or CORFing if their public image is being highly threatened.
In addition, most studies only test for the identification with one favorite team, there haven't been many studies on the effects of having multiple favorite teams. In one article it suggests that, "some sport fans have more than one 'favorite team' and choose to identify with a winning team to afford more opportunities to BIRG". This suggestion could impact the occurrences of BIRGing and CORFing and therefore needs to be investigated further.

A study published by Spinda in 2011 found significant differences between male and female BIRGing and CORFing constructs.

Conclusion

Whether it is the sticker on a parent's van that says "Proud parent of an Honor Roll student" or having jerseys/posters of one's favorite sports team, humans attempt to improve their self-esteem and self-worth through basking in other's triumphs and broadcasting their association with powerful/successful people. Basking in reflected glory has the potential to create self-glory and is connected with social identity theory.

There have been psychological studies done that confirm the ideas and theories of basking in reflected glory. The first major study was done by Cialdini as he researched BIRGing in winning/losing football fans. Research by Boen et al. has also confirmed the opposite of BIRGing, cutting off reflected failure (the idea that people tend to disassociate themselves with people of lower status). Basking in reflected glory is not necessarily negative unless it is taken to the extreme and a person only views himself in terms of his affiliations with his BIRGing group. Increases in technology have led to an increase in the ability to bask in reflected glory; a person can now advertise their associations on Facebook, Twitter, and other social networking sites.

See also
Persuasion

References

Aronson, E., Wilson, T. D., & Akert, R. M. (2010). Social Psychology (Seventh ed.). Upper Saddle River, NJ: Pearson Education.
Bernache-Assollant, I., Lacassagne, M., & Braddock, J.(2007). Basking in Reflected Glory and Blasting: Differences in Identity-Management Strategies Between Two Groups of Highly Identified Soccer Fans. Journal of Language and Social Psychology, 26(4), 381.  Retrieved April 8, 2011, from ProQuest Psychology Journals. (Document ID: 1392873641).
Burger, Jerry M. (1985). "Temporal Effects on Attributions for Academic Performances and Reflected-Glory Basking." Social Psychology Quarterly, 48(4), 330-36.
Dijkstra, J. K., Cillessen, A. H. N., Lindenberg, S. and Veenstra, R. (2010), Basking in Reflected Glory and Its Limits: Why Adolescents Hang Out With Popular Peers. Journal of Research on Adolescence, 20: 942–958.
Kahle, Lynn R., and Chris Riley. Sports Marketing and the Psychology of Marketing Communication. Mahwah, NJ: L. Erlbaum Associates, 2004. Print.
Lee, M. (1985). Self-esteem and social identity in basketball fans: A closer look at basking-in-related-glory, Journal of Sport Behavior, 8, 210-223
Snyder, C.R., Lassegard, M., & Ford, C.E. (1986). Distancing after group success and failure: Basking in reflected glory and cutting off reflected failure. Journal of Personality and Social Psychology, 51, 382-388.

Cognition